The Belgian railway line 50 is a railway line in Belgium connecting Brussels to Ghent. The first section between Ghent and Schellebelle was finished in 1837, offering a connection to Brussels through Dendermonde and Mechelen. The section between Schellebelle and Brussels was completed on 1 May 1856.

A section between Ghent and Ostend was completed in 1838 and is named line 50A. Between 1923 and 1933, the line 50A was extended to Brussels, which provides a fast connection between Brussels and Ghent. Where the original line 50 enters Brussels from the North, after passing through the city and station of Aalst, the later 50A enters Brussels from the South; this allows through trains from the West of the country to the East or vice versa without having to reverse. In 2016, line 50A was widened with two extra tracks, labelled 50C, between Denderleeuw and Brussels; the main reason was the increase in traffic from the GEN/RER commuter trains.

The following stations are located on the original line 50:
 Brussels-North
 Bockstael
 Jette
 Berchem-Sainte-Agathe
 Groot-Bijgaarden
 Dilbeek
 Sint-Martens-Bodegem
 Ternat
 Essene Lombeek
 Liedekerke
 Denderleeuw
 Erembodegem
 Aalst
 Lede
 Serskamp
 Schellebelle
 Wetteren
 Kwatrecht
 Melle
 Merelbeke
 Gent-Sint-Pieters

A new station  was built in Anderlecht, near the COOVI/CERIA campus; it entered service with the updated schedules on 14 December 2020, with an hourly service by the S3 line of the Brussels Regional Express Network.

References

50
50
Aalst, Belgium
City of Brussels
Transport in Ghent